VK is a brand of alcopop produced by Global Brands. It is sold and marketed in the United Kingdom. Morning Advertiser ranked it as the second most popular UK ready-to-drink beverage in 2022, after WKD.

Product information
VK contains 4% alcohol by volume (ABV). The drink was launched in 1997 in Chesterfield, England.

Varieties

:

References

External links
Official website

Premixed alcoholic drinks
Alcopops
British alcoholic drinks